The castra of Bulci was a fort in the Roman province of Dacia located on the western side of defensive line of forts, limes Daciae. Its ruins are located in Bulci (commune Bata, Romania).

Location and function
The region in Arad county has been inhabited with short interruptions since the Neolithic. During the first half of the 1st millennium BC, the Dacians founded their first branches on both sides of Marisus. From the 6th century BC onwards, the Scythians, among others, settled here and later merged into the Dacians. At the end of the 4th century BC Celtic tribes also began to migrate here but they were also quickly assimilated by the Dacians.

The fort, possibly occupied by an auxiliary cohort, lay east of today's village of Bata on the left bank of the Mureș. The site is also known by its field names "Cetate" (castle) or "Mănăstire" (monastery). Its crew was responsible, among other things, for monitoring and securing the road from Micia to Partiscum, which followed the southern bank of the river in the North-West direction.

The fort
The fort area has only been insufficiently researched. It was first examined in 1868 by Flóris Rómer, the founder of provincial Roman archaeology in Hungary, and then between 1976 and 1980 smaller search excavations were carried out by István Ferenczi and Mircea Barbu. The defence consisted of a wooden-earth wall with a ditch in front of it as an obstacle to approach. Only small traces of the internal buildings could be found. The brick stamps found in Legio XIII Gemina seem to at least confirm the identification of the site as a Roman military installation of the 2nd century AD. The fortification was probably built by a vexillation of this legion. No remains of the fort itself can be seen in the area today.

The finds from the excavations can be found today in the Museum complex Arad, Department of Archaeology and History (Romanian "Complexul muzeal Arad, Secția Arheologie și Istorie").

Monument protection
The entire archaeological site, and in particular the fort, are protected as historical monuments under Act No. 422/2001, adopted in 2001, and are entered on the National List of Historical Monuments (Lista Monumentelor Istorice). The Ministry of Culture and National Heritage (Ministerul Culturii şi Patrimoniului Naţional), in particular the General Directorate of National Cultural Heritage, the Department of Fine Arts and the National Commission of Historical Monuments, and other important institutions subordinate to the Ministry, are responsible for the protection of the entire archaeological site and in particular the fort. Unauthorized excavations and the export of antique objects are prohibited in Romania.

See also

List of castra

External links
Roman castra from Romania - Google Maps / Earth

Notes

Roman legionary fortresses in Romania
History of Banat
Historic monuments in Arad County